Mark Craib (born 8 February 1970) is a Scottish footballer, who played in the Scottish Football League for Dundee and Montrose.

External links

1970 births
Living people
Association football central defenders
Scottish footballers
Dundee F.C. players
Montrose F.C. players
Scottish Football League players
Sportspeople from St Andrews
Footballers from Fife